Ross 154 (V1216 Sgr) is a star in the southern zodiac constellation of Sagittarius. It has an apparent visual magnitude of 10.44, making it much too faint to be seen with the naked eye. At a minimum, viewing Ross 154 requires a telescope with an aperture of
 under ideal conditions. It is the nearest star in the southern constellation Sagittarius, and one of the nearest stars to the Sun.

Description
This star was first catalogued by American astronomer Frank Elmore Ross in 1925, and formed part of his fourth list of new variable stars. In 1926, he added it to his second list of stars showing a measurable proper motion after comparing its position with photographic plates taken earlier by fellow American astronomer E. E. Barnard. This placed the star at the sixth position of the then-known nearby stars.

Ross 154 was found to be a UV Ceti-type flare star, with a mean time between major flares of about two days. The first such flare activity was observed from Australia in 1951 when the star increased in magnitude by 0.4. Typically, the star will increase by 3–4 magnitudes during a flare. The strength of the star's surface magnetic field is an estimated . Ross 154 is an X-ray source and it has been detected by several X-ray observatories. X-ray flare emission from this star has been observed by Chandra observatory, with a particularly large flare emitting .

A stellar classification of M3.5V makes this a red dwarf star that is generating energy through the nuclear fusion of hydrogen at its core. It has an estimated 18% of the Sun's mass and 20% of the Sun's radius, but it is radiating only 0.4% of the luminosity of the Sun. In contrast to the Sun where convection only occurs in the outer layers, a red dwarf with a mass this low will be entirely convective. Based on the relatively high projected rotation, this is probably a young star with an estimated age of less than a billion years. The abundance of elements heavier than helium is about half that in the Sun.

No low-mass companions have been discovered in orbit around Ross 154. Nor does it display the level of excess infrared emission that would suggest the presence of circumstellar dust. Such debris disks are rare among M-type star systems older than about 10 million years, having been primarily cleared away by drag from the stellar wind. The space velocity components of this star in the galactic coordinate system are  = [–12.2, –1.0, –7.2]. Based on its low velocity relative to the Sun, this is believed to be a young disk (Population I) star. This star will make its closest approach to the Sun in about 157,000 years, when it comes within
.

See also
 Frank Elmore Ross
 List of nearest stars and brown dwarfs

References

Notes

External links
 SolStation.com: Ross 154

Flare stars
M-type main-sequence stars
Local Bubble
Sagittarius (constellation)
Durchmusterung objects
154
0729
092403
Sagittarii, V1216
?